John Joseph Timothy Hennessey (August 20, 1921 – March 20, 2001) was a United States Army four-star general who served as Commander in Chief, United States Readiness Command (USCINCRED) from 1974 to 1979.

Military career
After attending Saint Mary's University of Minnesota for three years, Hennessey enrolled in the United States Military Academy and graduated in 1944, receiving his commission in the infantry. He deployed to the Europe Theater, serving as a platoon leader and company commander.

In the Korean War he served on the staff of I Corps. By the Vietnam War he was a battalion commander in the 11th Air Assault Division, later serving as executive officer of the division's 1st Brigade. When the 11th Air Assault Division was converted to the 1st Cavalry Division (Air Mobile) in 1965, he accompanied that unit to Vietnam as executive officer of the 1st Brigade, later becoming brigade commander after being promoted to full colonel.

On 4 August 1967 the Chief of Staff of the United States Army established the Task Group on Army Preparedness in Civil Disturbance Matters chaired by Hennessey from the Office of the Deputy Chief of Staff for Military Operations, the work of this task group was conducted largely by field grade officers and was probably the most comprehensive study of the Army’s civil disturbance mission ever conducted.

As a brigadier general he served as assistant division commander of the 82nd Airborne Division, then became assistant division commander of the 101st Airborne Division, deploying with that unit to Vietnam as its commander in 1970.

In 1974 he received his fourth star and assumed command of the United States Readiness Command at MacDill Air Force Base in December 1974. He retired in 1979 at the end of that tour.

Decorations
His awards and decorations include the Defense Distinguished Service Medal, the Army Distinguished Service Medal, Legion of Merit with Oak Leaf Cluster, the Bronze Star  with "V" and three Oak Leaf Clusters, the Air Medal with four Oak Leaf Clusters, the Combat Infantryman Badge, Army Aviator Badge and Master Parachutist badge.

  Defense Distinguished Service Medal
  Army Distinguished Service Medal
  Legion of Merit with oak leaf cluster
  Bronze Star with Combat V and three oak leaf clusters
  Air Medal with four oak leaf clusters

Post military career
After retiring from the Army, Hennessey served on the board of trustees of the University of Tampa and was executive director of the Tampa Bay Area Research and Development Authority under the University of South Florida.

Hennessey died of a stroke on March 20, 2001 at the age of 79.

References

4 stars and 3 wars: General did the job
Carmel Life - Spotlight on the Class of 1938

1921 births
2001 deaths
United States Military Academy alumni
United States Army personnel of World War II
United States Army personnel of the Korean War
United States Army personnel of the Vietnam War
United States Army aviators
United States Army generals
Recipients of the Distinguished Service Medal (US Army)
Recipients of the Legion of Merit
Recipients of the Air Medal
Recipients of the Defense Distinguished Service Medal
Commandants of the United States Army Command and General Staff College